William Newton (died 1453), of Swell, Somerset, was an English politician.

Newton married twice. His first wife, Maud, died on 24 February 1419; she was the widow of Sir John Lorty. By 1429, Newton had married again, to Idonea née Montague. With Idonea he had one son.

He was a Member (MP) of the Parliament of England for Dorchester in May 1413.

References

Year of birth missing
1453 deaths
English MPs May 1413
Politicians from Somerset
Members of the Parliament of England for Dorchester